This is a list of Italian football transfers for the January sale in 2007–08 season. Only moves from Serie A and Serie B are listed.

The winter transfer window was open for 4 weeks, starting on 3 January 2008. The window closed at midnight on 31 January. Players without a club may join one, either during or in between transfer windows.

For Alexandre Pato, although the deal was finalized between the two clubs in summer 2007, but FIFA would only permit international transfer for a player over 18 (with some exceptional clauses), and the deal would be registered in the windows after his 18th birthday, so Pato officially became a player of AC Milan on 4 January 2008.

Winter transfer window

Temp

See also
List of Italian football transfers Summer 2007

References
general
 
specific

Tran
Italy
2007-08